Alek Osmanović (born 30 November 1982) is a Croatian bobsledder. He competed in the four man event at the 2006 Winter Olympics.

References

External links
 

1982 births
Living people
Croatian male bobsledders
Olympic bobsledders of Croatia
Bobsledders at the 2006 Winter Olympics
Sportspeople from Makarska